Aron Michael Ekberg (born 30 March 1991), better known by his stage name AronChupa, is a Swedish singer, record producer, songwriter, artist and DJ. His 2014 song "I'm an Albatraoz" reached number 1 on the Swedish Singles Chart and in Denmark, and top 10 in many charts across Europe. It also reached number 25 in the UK and number 10 in the US dance charts. His younger sister, Nora Ekberg, better known professionally as Little Sis Nora, provided the vocals for the track and starred in the music video, but never appeared as featured artist on the track. The music video has surpassed 1.35 billion views on YouTube.

Career
Ekberg attended San Francisco's Academy of Art University around 2011-2013 and played on the school's soccer team before moving back to Sweden.
Aron started his professional music career in Swedish electro house-hip hop band, Albatraoz, founded in 2012 by himself along with four of his best friends whom he had met while growing up. On 2 August 2013, their debut single was released, the self-titled song "Albatraoz" and shortly after they signed with Sony Music. The song reached 36 on the Swedish Singles Chart and remained on the chart for 18 weeks. "Albatraoz" was certified double platinum in Sweden. In January 2014 the song had reached 8.5 million plays on Spotify and the group toured to promote the song. The band followed up with a few singles, including "Arriba" and "Wunderbar", while touring Scandinavia from 2013 to 2017 before dissolving in 2017.

On 20 March 2014, Ekberg released his debut solo single, "I'm an Albatraoz", with his younger sister, Nora Ekberg, better known as Little Sis Nora, on vocals. After some success independently Ekberg also signed his solo project to Sony Music. The song reached number 1 in Sweden and Denmark and top 10 in Germany, Austria, Norway, Finland, Australia and the Netherlands. It was certified double platinum in Sweden and Australia and platinum in New Zealand, Italy and Denmark. The music video also has over 1.3 billion views on YouTube.

His second single dropped on 20 November 2015, titled "Fired Cuz I Was Late", and peaked at number 100 in Sweden.

On 26 February 2016, Ekberg released his third solo single, "Little Swing", which features Little Sis Nora. The song gained slight recognition in the UK when Vodafone UK started using it in their roaming advert campaign.

On 17 July 2020, he released the song "The Woodchuck Song". It peaked at number 12 on Spotify's "Sweden Viral 50".

Discography

Singles

Notes

Remixes

2016
 Little Richard - Tutti Frutti (AronChupa Remix)

2017
 Dirtywknd - Dirty Weekend (AronChupa Remix)
 Marcus & Martinus - Make You Believe In Love (AronChupa Remix)
 This Diamond Life feat. Karen Harding - The Weekend
 The Collapsable Hearts Club feat. Jim Bianco & Petra Haden - Easy Street (AronChupa Remix) / Featured in "The Cell", an episode of The Walking Dead aired on 6 November 2016.

Notes
A: Swedish singer and AronChupa's younger sister Nora Ekberg provides the vocals for the tracks.

References

1991 births
Electro house musicians
Living people
Musicians from Västra Götaland County
Nu-disco musicians
People from Borås
Remixers
Sony BMG artists
Swedish DJs
Swedish house musicians
Swedish record producers
Swedish singer-songwriters
Synth-pop musicians
Tracker musicians
Academy of Art University alumni
Electronic dance music DJs
21st-century Swedish singers
21st-century Swedish male singers